The word gluteomics describes the systematic study on the T cell stimulatory peptides in celiac disease. These peptides are derived from gluten or gluten-like proteins. Usually the term gluteomics is used in the context of global approach to identify, target or detect large sets of the disease-related sequences.

The scientific methods usually employed by gluteomic studies include novel epitope identification by means of database searching with dedicated algorithms, studies on toxicity of fractions of gluten and/or gluten-like proteins, degradation of multiple T cell stimulatory sequences with the specific enzymes, and development of protocols for the detection of peptides implicated in the pathogenesis of celiac disease.

See also
Gluteome

Gluten